Tom Six (born 29 August 1973) is a Dutch  filmmaker, writer, and actor. He is best known for his trilogy of body horror films; The Human Centipede (First Sequence), The Human Centipede 2 (Full Sequence), and The Human Centipede 3 (Final Sequence). Six was an original director of Dutch reality TV series Big Brother, which has since become an international franchise.

Early life
Tom Six was born in Alkmaar, North Holland, in the Netherlands on 29 August 1973.

Career
Six started a film production company with his sister Ilona called Six Entertainment, where he wrote and directed such films as Gay in Amsterdam, Honeyz and I Love Dries (later retitled What the F**k?!), about the aspiring Dutch singer Dries Roelvink.

Six had success with the film The Human Centipede. Although it met with mixed reviews and reactions, The Human Centipede garnered widespread attention. The first film's success gave Six the flexibility he needed to work on a sequel, The Human Centipede 2 (Full Sequence), eventually leading to a trilogy. He made the first film to get viewers comfortable with the idea of the Human Centipede. Both the controversial content of the first film and the second's brutal depictions of sexual violence have generated controversy. In the United Kingdom, the BBFC declined to issue an 18 certificate for The Human Centipede 2 (Full Sequence), highlighting the antagonist's "total degradation, humiliation, mutilation, torture, and murder of his naked victims". Six then submitted a new cut with two minutes and 37 seconds removed and received the 18 certificate. Six responded with mixed feelings. On the one hand, he was devastated that he had to cut his film, and on the other, the decision of the BBFC gained much press and notoriety. He has said, "In the UK, censors cut many minutes from The Human Centipede 2 by law. It feels like I made a comedy and they cut out all the good jokes. It’s appalling. Nobody is forced to see a movie."

The final film in the Human Centipede series, The Human Centipede 3 (Final Sequence), was released on 22 May 2015. Tom Six's idea was that each of the three sequences of The Human Centipede can stand on their own as a self-contained film, or they can be connected into a single 4.5 hour-long movie. The Human Centipede 2 begins where the original ends, while The Human Centipede 3 begins where The Human Centipede 2 ends; therefore, the three films together make a "movie centipede" titled The Human Centipede (Complete Sequence).

Six is currently trying to distribute the satirical psychological horror film The Onania Club, originally due in 2017, but later delayed to 2019, and now with no release date. He previously commented on the matter, saying that "great art takes time." However, in 2021, Six admitted there have been issues getting it released after the distributor decided not to release it, which led to Six asking fans for support to get it released.

Filmography

Notes

References

External links

Interview with Tom Six

1973 births
Living people
Dutch film directors
Dutch screenwriters
Dutch male screenwriters
People from Alkmaar
Horror film directors